Charles L. Swain (April 19, 1866 – February 28, 1933) was a Democratic politician from Cincinnati, Ohio, United States who was Speaker of the Ohio House of Representatives, and an unsuccessful candidate for Ohio's 2nd congressional district.

Biography

Charles Luther Swain was born April 19, 1866 at Fincastle, Brown County, Ohio. His father, Samuel Luther Swain was born in Pennsylvania and was a miller. Charles followed that trade for some time, and then removed with his family to West Union, Adams County, Ohio at age 13, where he lived until moving to Cincinnati, Ohio.

Swain was educated at the public schools and at Ohio Northern University at Ada, Ohio. He taught school for eight years, and was School Examiner for Adams County for four years. He graduated from Cincinnati Law School and was admitted to the bar in 1893, locating in Cincinnati to practice.
Swain was elected to represent Hamilton County, Ohio in the Ohio House of Representatives for the 73rd and 74th General Assemblies, 1898-1901. In 1898, Swain was nominated by the Democrats for Ohio's 2nd congressional district, and lost the general election to Republican Jacob H. Bromwell.

Swain was again elected to the 80th General Assembly, 1913–1914, and was chosen by his party caucus as Speaker.

Charles Swain was married August 23, 1894 to Anna M. Burket. He was married again 1907 to Ada McGowan of Hartwell, Ohio. He was married again to Hester Louise Daniels of Macon Ohio on November 14, 1917. He was a Presbyterian and a member of the Order of Knights of Pythias.

He died at Cincinnati in 1933 of brain fever after a long illness.

References

1866 births
1933 deaths
Speakers of the Ohio House of Representatives
Democratic Party members of the Ohio House of Representatives
Politicians from Cincinnati
University of Cincinnati College of Law alumni
Ohio lawyers
Ohio Northern University alumni
People from Brown County, Ohio
People from West Union, Ohio